This page provides supplementary chemical data on aniline.

Material Safety Data Sheet  

The handling of this chemical may incur notable safety precautions. It is highly recommend that you seek the Material Safety Datasheet (MSDS) for this chemical from a reliable source and follow its directions.
Mallinckrodt Baker
Science Stuff

Structure and properties

Thermodynamic properties

Vapor pressure of liquid

Table data obtained from CRC Handbook of Chemistry and Physics 44th ed.

Distillation data
See also:
 m-xylene (data page)
 p-xylene (data page)

Spectral data

UV Absorbance Spectroscopy of Aniline
Aniline is a benzenoid compound. The NH2 group attached to the benzene ring means that there is a lone pair of electrons that can enter into conjugation with the benzene ring resulting in delocalization in the aniline.

Aniline absorbs in the K (220 - 250 nm) and the B (250 - 290 nm) bands exhibited by benzenoid compounds. The K and B bands arise from π to π* transitions as a result of the a group containing multiple bond being attached to the benzene ring. When dissolved in ethanol, λmax for aniline is 230 nm, but in dilute aqueous acid λmax is 203 nm.  In the latter case the anilinium cation is formed and the lone pair is no longer available for conjugation with the benzene ring.  Consequently, the absorption of the molecule shifts to the lower λmax value and behaves like benzene.

Regulatory data

References

 
 Finar, I.L. (1974); Organic Chemistry Vol.2 – Stereochemistry and the chemistry of natural products 5th. Ed. Longman

Chemical data pages
Chemical data pages cleanup